Ursula Sternberg-Hertz (1925-2000) was a German-English painter. She was self-taught as an artist.

She was Jewish, and fled Germany with her family at the age of eleven because of the Nazis. During World War II she and her family stayed in Holland and later Belgium, but she was sent into hiding away from her family for a while because her father was afraid her appearance was too Jewish. At the end of World War II she moved to England to work in textile design and commercial art. In 1971 she moved to Elkins Park, and in 1989 she moved to Chestnut Hill. 

Her work was acquired by places including Duke University, New York Public Library, Victoria and Albert Museum, and the Woodmere Art Museum.

She was married to Jonathan Sternberg until her death.

References

1925 births
2000 deaths
German emigrants to the United Kingdom